Leslye Headland (born 1980) is an American film and television director, producer, screenwriter, and playwright. She is known for the play and 2012 film Bachelorette and 2015 film Sleeping with Other People. She co-created the Netflix series Russian Doll, along with Natasha Lyonne and Amy Poehler.

Early life and education 
Headland, raised in suburban Maryland, graduated in 1999 from Staples High School. She received her BFA in drama from the Tisch School of the Arts at New York University in 2002.

Career 
Upon graduating college, Headland spent six years working as an assistant at Miramax, a year of which was spent as Harvey Weinstein's personal assistant. Her experience during that time is what inspired her 2012 play Assistance. As a playwright, she is best known for her Seven Deadly Sins cycle: Cinephillia (lust), Bachelorette (gluttony), Assistance (greed), Surfer Girl (sloth), Reverb (wrath), The Accidental Blonde (envy), and Cult of Love (pride). Part of the inspiration for the Seven Deadly Plays came from her Christian upbringing. Her final play in the series, Cult of Love, opened in 2018. She has also written a neo-noir style play The Layover which received mixed reviews in 2016.

Headland got her first job in the television industry in 2010 as a staff writer on the FX series Terriers. She wrote and directed the 2012 film version of her play Bachelorette, which was her debut as a feature film director. The film premiered at the Sundance Film Festival. Bachelorette co-starred Kirsten Dunst, Lizzy Caplan, and Isla Fisher as three troubled women who reunite for the wedding of a friend played by Rebel Wilson, who was ridiculed in high school.

Headland's play Assistance premiered in 2008 and was staged in 2012 at the New York theatre space Playwrights Horizons. Television rights were acquired by NBC in 2013, to be executive-produced by Will Ferrell and Adam McKay; Krysten Ritter of the ABC series Don't Trust the B---- in Apartment 23 was set to both star and executive produce. Dramatists Play Service published Assistance in late 2013.

Headland is the screenwriter of the 2014 remake of the film About Last Night, itself an adaptation of the 1974 David Mamet play Sexual Perversity in Chicago.

In 2015, Headland directed Sleeping with Other People based on her own script, which starred Jason Sudeikis and Alison Brie. At the premier of the film, Headland said in an interview with The Wrap that her "elevator" pitch for the movie was, "Like When Harry Met Sally for assholes." The film premiered at the Sundance Film Festival.

Headland has directed episodes of the television series Heathers (for which she also served as an executive producer) and two consecutive episodes of the 2016 Starz TV series Blunt Talk, starring Patrick Stewart. She has also directed episodes for SMILF and Black Monday.

Headland directed four episodes and co-wrote three episodes of Russian Doll, which she co-created for Netflix with Natasha Lyonne and Amy Poehler. Russian Doll is the first television series that Headland co-created, and she was the last of the three women to come on board for the project. The series premiered on February 1, 2019. On the female driven narrative of Russian Doll, Headland stated, "It was really important to explore a show about a female protagonist that asked spiritual and existential questions, as opposed to a show that was about a woman finding romance, a woman finding balance between her personal life and her love life... those are all worthy endeavors and excellent shows are made about all of those things, but we were just thinking 'What hasn't been done?'"

Headland was hired by Netflix to direct the upcoming film Tell Me Everything, a thriller about marriage based on the young adult novel of the same name. She is also set to executive produce and direct a film based on the novel American Huckster: How Chuck Blazer Got Rich from-and Sold Out-the Most Powerful Cabal in World Sports for HBO Films starring Will Ferrell. She is additionally anticipated to executive produce and direct the first episode of the upcoming Fox series Sisters. Headland has alluded to being involved in a second season of Russian Doll, though no details on the season have been confirmed. In 2019, she signed a deal with Fox 21 Television Studios.

On April 22, 2020, it was unofficially announced through Variety that Headland would be the showrunner and writer for an upcoming Star Wars series on the Disney+ streaming service. The series would be female-centric and would take place in a different part of the "Star Wars" timeline than other projects in the franchise. On May 4, 2020 (Star Wars Day), it was officially announced that Headland will write, executive produce, and serve as showrunner for her own Star Wars series for Disney+, entitled The Acolyte, which takes place during the final days of the High Republic.

Influences and themes 
Leslye Headland was brought up in a strict religious home and grew up watching the Marx Brothers and MGM musicals. Headland notes that Alfred Hitchcock's film Rear Window was the first time she saw the camera as a tool and realized what a director did. Later in life as she was completing her BFA at New York University, Headland notes the difficulty and dark time faced due to the 9/11 attack and names David Fincher's Fight Club as the reason she has a lifelong artistic need to make a joke about what is truly painful.

Much of Headland's work focuses on cultural vandalism. Addiction is also a theme that plays heavily into her projects. Regarding her work Headland has stated, "I'm attracted to stories about people who have created prisons for themselves and are trying to get out of them."

Personal life 
Headland identifies as a lesbian and married actress Rebecca Henderson in September 2016.

Filmography

Film

Television

Awards and nominations

See also 
 List of female film and television directors
 List of lesbian filmmakers

References

External links 

 
 
  The New York Times on Headland's Assistance (2012)
 The New York Times on Headland's play Bachelorette (2010)
 Wall Street Journal on Leslye Headland

1980 births
Living people
21st-century American dramatists and playwrights
21st-century American women writers
American women dramatists and playwrights
American women film directors
American women screenwriters
American lesbian artists
American lesbian writers
Film directors from Connecticut
Film directors from Maryland
Writers from Connecticut
Writers from Maryland
People from Westport, Connecticut
Tisch School of the Arts alumni
Staples High School alumni